The CANT 38 was a proposed reconnaissance/bomber biplane flying boat developed by CANT.

Design and development
In the 1930s the CRDA tried to relaunch the CANT 21bis model commercially, the latest evolution of the original CANT 21, already modified to better adapt it to the needs of a modern military aeronautics. The project was again developed by the engineer Conflenti and provided for a rationalization of the equipment inside the hull maintaining the appearance and motorization of the model from which it derived. The new model assumed the CANT 38 company designation, but although official photographs had been distributed that depicted it, no prototype was actually built. The photo shoot was prepared only for advertising purposes exploiting the similarity of the future model with the CANT 21bis and reproducing one of the old models to which the original writing on the drift was replaced and replaced by a "38". The CANT 38 failed to collect any commercial interest and the company of Monfalcone decided to abandon its development.

Specifications

See also

cant 38
1930s Italian patrol aircraft
Flying boats
Biplanes